Euryusa is a genus of beetles belonging to the family Staphylinidae.

The species of this genus are found in Europe.

Species:
 Euryusa aliena Cameron, 1945 
 Euryusa anatolica Assing, 2002

References

Staphylinidae
Staphylinidae genera